The Yamaha YZF-R25  is a motorcycle manufactured by Yamaha since 2014. It is Yamaha's first 250 cc sport motorcycle since the four-cylinder FZR250 that was sold between 1986 and 1994. A first for Yamaha twins, in common with the R3, the R25 uses an offset cylinder design.

The YZF-R25 was updated for 2019.

Yamaha MT-25

The Yamaha MT-25 is the naked bike version of the YZF-R25, part of the MT series of standard motorcycles and manufactured by Yamaha since 2015.

The MT-25 received an update in October 2019.

References

External links 

 Official website (Indonesia) (MT-25)
 Official website (Indonesia) (YZF-R25)
 

MT-25
Standard motorcycles
Motorcycles introduced in 2015
Motorcycles powered by straight-twin engines
Sport bikes
Motorcycles introduced in 2014